Thug Holiday is the fifth studio album by American rapper Trick Daddy. It was released on August 6, 2002 through Slip-N-Slide/Atlantic Records. Production was handled by Gorilla Tek, Supa a.k.a. Infa Red, Red Spyda, Cool & Dre, David Banner, Deep Fried Camp, Jazze Pha, Jim Jonsin, Lil' Jon, Majid "Chi" Hasan, Minnesota, Rob "Reef" Tewlow, Sean "Face" Foote, Signature, and DJ Nabs, with Ted Lucas serving as executive producer. It features guest appearances from Tre+6, Rick Ross, Supa a.k.a. Infa Red, Duece Poppito, Big Boi, Big LEXX, Birdman, CeeLo Green, Denny, LaTocha Scott, Milk, Mystic, Scarface, and Betty Wright's Children's Choir. The album debuted at number 6 on the Billboard 200 with 129,500 copies sold in the first week released. A month later the album was certified gold by the Recording Industry Association of America for an excess of 500,000 copies.

Track listing

Charts

Weekly charts

Year-end charts

Certifications

References

External links

2002 albums
Trick Daddy albums
Atlantic Records albums
Albums produced by Lil Jon
Albums produced by Jazze Pha
Albums produced by Cool & Dre
Albums produced by Jim Jonsin
Albums produced by David Banner